Upputhode  is a village in Idukki district in the Indian state of Kerala.

Demographics
As of 2011 Census, Upputhode had a population of 8,755 with 4,375 males and 4,380 females. The average sex ratio was 1001 lower than the state average of 1084. In Upputhode, 10.45% of the population was under 6 years of age. Upputhode had an average literacy of 97% higher than the state average of 94%; male literacy was 97.7% and female literacy was 96.4%.

References

Villages in Idukki district